Aslam Abdul Raheem (born 24 June 1971) is a retired Maldivian footballer who played as a goalkeeper, and a current goalkeeper trainer at Club Valencia. He is also the goalkeeper trainer of the senior Maldives national football team and all youth levels.

International career
Aslam has appeared in FIFA World Cup qualifying matches for the Maldives.

References

External links 
 
 
 

1971 births
Living people
Maldivian footballers
Maldives international footballers
New Radiant S.C. players
Club Valencia players
Association football goalkeepers